is a railway station located in the town of Ajigasawa, Aomori Prefecture Japan, operated by the East Japan Railway Company (JR East).

Lines

Station layout
Mutsu-Akaishi  Station has one ground-level side platform serving a single bi-directional track. The station is unattended. The station was built with dual opposed side platforms, but only the former southbound platform is now used.

History
Mutsu-Akaishi Station was opened on November 26, 1929 as a station on the Japan National Railways (JNR). It has been unattended since March 19, 1984. With the privatization of the JNR on April 1, 1987, it came under the operational control of JR East.

Surrounding area

Akaishi Post Office

See also
 List of Railway Stations in Japan

References

External links

  

Stations of East Japan Railway Company
Railway stations in Aomori Prefecture
Gonō Line
Ajigasawa, Aomori
Railway stations in Japan opened in 1929